Live in Santa Monica is a double live album by Iranian singer, Ebi, taped at the Santa Monica Civic Auditorium in March 1994.

Album information
Live in Santa Monica was released on October 16, 2001". The performance also included covering Googoosh's Hit-songs, which appears on last track of the first volume.

Track listing

References

Ebi albums
Albums recorded at the Santa Monica Civic Auditorium
2001 live albums